The 2006–07 Superliga season will be the 19th since its establishment.

Teams and locations

League table

Results

See also
 2007 Copa de la Reina de Fútbol

References

Season on soccerway

2006-07
Spa
1
women